Ekaterina Andreyevna Stolyarova (born ) is a Russian freestyle skier, specializing in Moguls.

Career
Stolyarova competed at the 2010 Winter Olympics for Russia. She placed 10th in the qualifying round of the moguls, advancing to the final, where she placed 7th.

As of April 2013, her best showing at the World Championships is 4th, in the 2011 moguls event.

Stolyarova made her World Cup debut in December 2005. As of March 2013, she has one World Cup victory, winning at Mont Gabriel in 2007/08. She has also earned three other podium finishes. Her best World Cup overall finish in moguls is 8th, in 2007/08.

World Cup Podiums

References

1988 births
Living people
Olympic freestyle skiers of Russia
Freestyle skiers at the 2010 Winter Olympics
Freestyle skiers at the 2014 Winter Olympics
Freestyle skiers at the 2018 Winter Olympics
People from Chusovoy
Russian female freestyle skiers
Sportspeople from Perm Krai